Brinton Nunatak is a small nunatak marking the west extremity of the Ford Nunataks. In the Wisconsin Range, Horlick Mountains. It was mapped by the United States Geological Survey from surveys and from U.S. Navy air photos 1960–64, and named by the Advisory Committee on Antarctic Names for Curtis C. Brinton utilitiesman with the Byrd Station winter party 1957.

References
 

Nunataks of Wilkes Land